Ricardo Viana Vargas is a Brazilian engineer, author of project management books and executive director of Brightline Initiative: a strategic initiative management movement formed by The Boston Consulting Group (BCG), Project Management Institute (PMI), Bristol-Myers Squibb, Saudi Telecom Company, Lee Hecht Harrison, NetEase and Agile Alliance.

Previously, Vargas was the director of infrastructure (engineering) and project management at the United Nations Office for Project Services (UNOPS).

Early life and education

Vargas was born in Belo Horizonte, Brazil. In 1995 he received a bachelor's degree in chemical engineering and in 2002 a master's degree in industrial engineering from Brazil's Federal University of Minas Gerais. Vargas also has a master's certificate in project management from George Washington University and training in strategy and innovation from Massachusetts Institute of Technology (MIT).

Career

Vargas has been a member of the Project Management Institute (PMI) since 1997 and served on the PMI's board of directors from 2007 to 2009. He was the first Brazilian member of the Institute's Board. Vargas became the first Latin American chair of the Board in 2009.

He has written multiple books on project management. Vargas also served as a reviser to the project management manual A Guide to the Project Management Body of Knowledge (PMBOK) published by PMI and chaired the Translation Verification Committee for the Guide's Brazilian Portuguese translation in 2000 and 2004.

From 2012 to 2016, Vargas worked as Director of infrastructure and project management at the United Nations Office for Project Services (UNOPS) where he was responsible for an annual budget of 1 billion dollars and headed a team of 300 project managers. One of his responsibilities was to create adequate infrastructure and adequate conditions in war refugee camps to receive migrants who found themselves obligated to leave their country of origin.

In 2017, he became the Executive Director of Brightline Initiative.

In 2018, Vargas co-wrote and co-produced "Zaatari- Memórias do Labirinto", a documentary detailing the largest refugee camp of the Syrian war that had become equivalent in size to the city of Jordan.

Awards

Vargas received the PMI Distinguished Contribution Award (DIST) and PMI Product of the Year Award in 2005.

In 2010, he was named Brazilian Project Management Personality of the Decade.

Microsoft rewarded Vargas for the years of 2013, 2014, 2015 and 2016 with the Most Valuable Professional (MVP) for his work with the Microsoft Project.

In 2015, Vargas received the TQM Award from the Association for the Advancement of Cost Engineering for his contribution to project management.

Bibliography
Analytical Hierarchy Process, Earned Value and other Project Management Themes 
Microsoft Project 2016
140条推文 让你项目管理快速入门 (Chinese)
Planning in 140 Tweets
Planejamento em 140 Tweets (Portuguese)
Planificación en 140 Tuits (Spanish)
Planlægning med 140 Tweets (Danish)
Planifier en 140 Tweets (French)
Pianificando in 140 Tweets (Italian)()
التخطيط في ١٤٠ تغريدة (Arabic)
Manual Prático do Plano de Projeto (Portuguese)
Practical Guide to Project Planning
Análise de Valor Agregado em Projetos 5a Edição (Portuguese)
Gerenciamento de Projetos: Estabelecendo Diferenciais Competitivos (Portuguese)
Gerenciamento de Projetos: Estratégia, Planejamento e Controle (Portuguese)
Microsoft Project 2013 Standard, Professional and Pro to Office 365 (Portuguese)
Microsoft Project 2010 Standard e Professional (Portuguese)
Microsoft Office Project 2007 (Portuguese)
Microsoft Office Project 2003 Standard, Professional e Server (Portuguese)
Microsoft Project 2002 (Portuguese)
Microsoft Project 2000 (Portuguese)
Construindo Times Eficazes (Portuguese)

References

External links
Official website

Living people
MIT Sloan School of Management alumni
People from Belo Horizonte
1972 births
Brazilian chemical engineers